Leopold Levy was an American businessman and public official. He owned a clothing retailer. Levy was a German immigrant.

He served as State Treasurer of Indiana from 1899 until 1903. He was a Republican.

The Indianapolis Museum of Art has a portrait of him by Charles Despiau. The Indiana State Museum has a kiddush cup he brought from Bavaria Germany.

His clothing business sold ready made clothing and advertised rock bottom prices.

References

State treasurers of Indiana
Indiana Republicans
Year of birth missing (living people)
Living people